= Markevich-Evtushevsky House =

- Дом Маркевича-Евтушевского
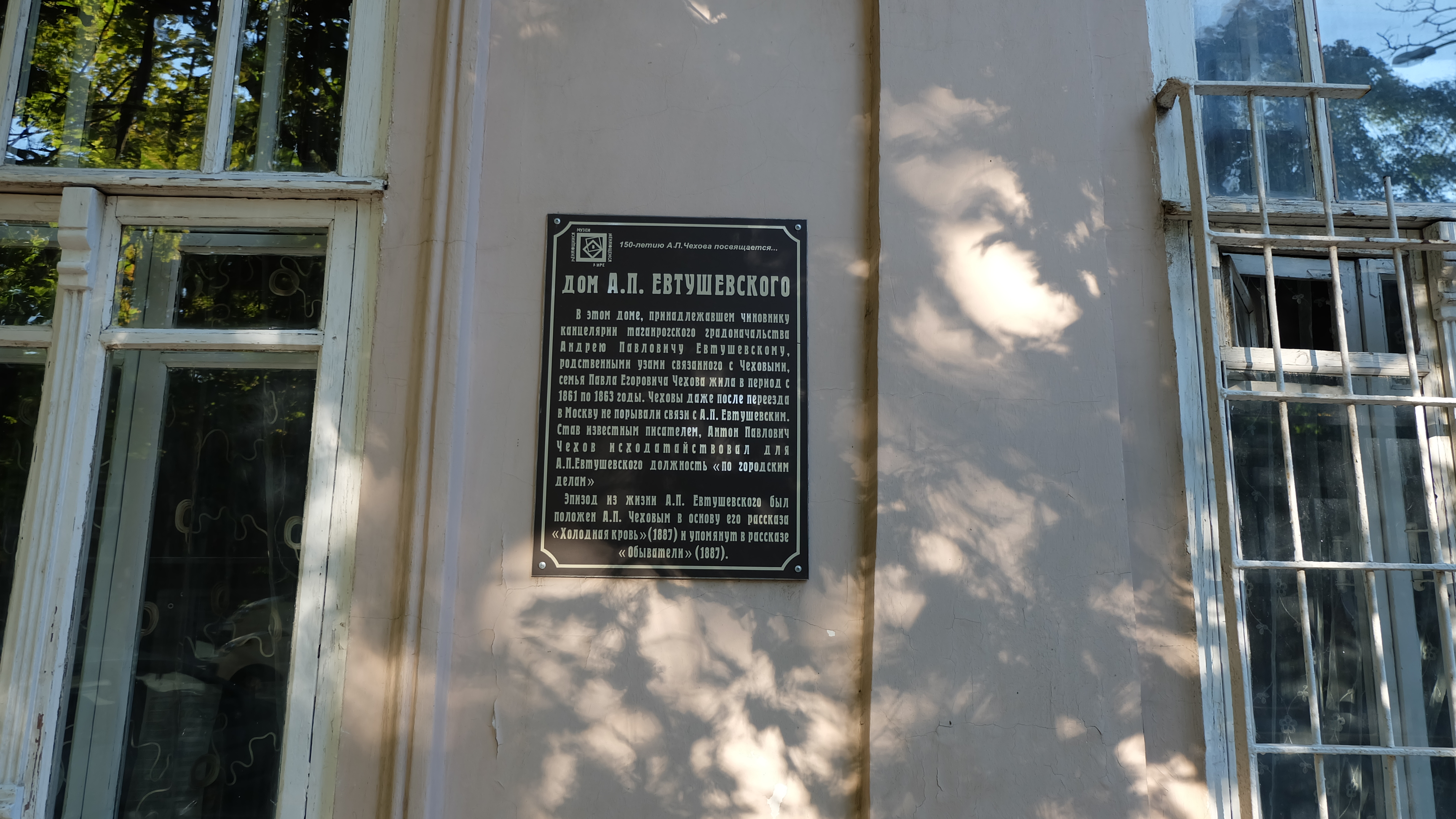
- Location: Taganrog, Anton Glushko Lane, 40
- Coordinates: 47°12′34″N 38°55′23″E

Markevich-Evtushevsky House (Russian: Дом Маркевича-Евтушевского) is a Russian historical monument. It was constructed in the first quarter of the 19th century in Taganrog of the Rostov Oblast. It is a one-story house with five windows.

== History ==
The house initially belonged to the local merchant A.N. Kamburov. It was then sold to Markevich-Evtushevsky. The property was once the office of the city's mayor. The house has the initials of its owners.

After a wedding, the mayor moved to the house of the spouse, and the house was given to Markevich-Yevtushenko's daughter, Lyudmila Pavlovna. She became wife to M. E. Chekhov and the aunt to Anton Pavlovich Chekhov. Among the tenants was P. E. Chekhov's family, and in this house, Ivan Chekhov was born. Years later, Anton Chekhov communicated with Markevich-Evtushevskimi. Chekhov's family lived in this house in 1861–2. In 1992 it became protected by the state as a monument.
